Cassafroneta is a monotypic genus of South Pacific dwarf spiders containing the single species, Cassafroneta forsteri. It was first described by A. D. Blest in 1979, and has only been found in New Zealand.

See also
 List of Linyphiidae species

References

Linyphiidae
Monotypic Araneomorphae genera
Spiders of New Zealand